Bootstraps: From an American Academic of Color is a 1993 book by Washington State University Regents Professor Victor Villanueva that uses his personal history as a struggling Puerto Rican academic to initiate a broader discussion of race and language in academia.

The book is notable for introducing the concept of Puerto Rican rhetoric in English. Villanueva initially believed the book's personal critique of the obstacles he faced as a Puerto Rican academic would "end his academic career," and later expressed surprise at its success. Later academics of color have referenced the book as "significant" in conceptualizing the relationship between people of color and fluency in English.

References

American autobiographies